The Amcotts Baronetcy, of Kettlethorpe Park in the County of Lincoln, was created in the Baronetage of Great Britain on 11 May 1796 for Wharton Amcotts. He represented Bedford in the House of Commons. He was succeeded according to a special remainder by his daughter's son William Ingilby, who in 1815 also succeeded his father in the Ingilby Baronetcy of Ripley Castle (see this title for more information on him). However, both titles became extinct on his death in 1854.

Amcotts later Ingilby later Amcotts-Ingilby baronets, of Kettlethorpe Park (1796) 
Sir Wharton Amcotts, 1st Baronet (1740–1807)
Sir William Amcotts-Ingilby, 2nd Baronet (1783–1854)

See also
Ingilby baronets, of Ripley Castle

Notes

Sources
Kidd, Charles, Williamson, David (editors). Debrett's Peerage and Baronetage (1990 edition). New York: St Martin's Press, 1990, 
 

Extinct baronetcies in the Baronetage of Great Britain
Baronetcies created with special remainders